King Pine Ski Area is a ski resort located in Madison, Carroll County, New Hampshire.

King Pine has 45 skiable acres, with six ski lifts and seventeen trails. King Pine also has 22 km of skate- and track-groomed cross country trails as well as snowshoeing, Zamboni-groomed ice skating, snowtubing, and a PSIA-certified ski school.

Amenities

Skiing and snowboarding
King Pine features 17 trails, 6 lifts, easy-to-navigate terrain, base lodge amenities, cafeteria, tavern, slopeside lodging, and has been in operation for over 50 years.

44% of King Pine's terrain is designed for novice and 31% for intermediate skiers and riders.

Adventure can be found on Pitch Pine (one of New England's steepest trails) or in the Twisted Pine Terrain Park, with hits, rails and challenging elements.

Night skiing
King Pine offers illuminated trails for skiing and snowboarding in the evening. Hours of operation vary. Eight trails are open at night and are served by two triple chairlifts, Powder Bear and Polar Bear. The following trails have night skiing: White Pine, King Pine, East Slope, West Slope, Pine Cone, Pine Board, Pine Spills, Knotty Pine, Scotch Pine and Crooked Pine.

Snowtubing
The Pine Meadows Snowtubing Park has three snowtubing lanes, serviced by a tow rope.

Ice skating
The Tohko Dome is an outdoor, covered ice rink. It is Zamboni-groomed weekly as conditions permit. The ice rink has an outdoor firepit, lights for skating at night and music.

Nordic skiing
The Purity Spring XC & Snowshoe Reserve features 20km of scenic, back-country nordic, and snowshoe trails. The trails wind through the forest surrounding Purity Lake, twisting through tall pines to the adjacent NH Audubon wildlife sanctuary. Cross-country skis are available in the King Pine Rental and Tune Shop.

Snowshoeing
There are 20km of snowshoe trails around King Pine and Purity Spring, including the adjacent NH Audubon wildlife sanctuary. Snowshoe rentals are available in the King Pine Rental and Tune Shop.

External links
King Pine – Official site
Purity Spring Resort – Parent company of King Pine Ski Area
King Pine – NewEnglandSkiHistory.com – photos and history

Buildings and structures in Carroll County, New Hampshire
Ski areas and resorts in New Hampshire
Tourist attractions in Carroll County, New Hampshire